Nishan-e-Shujaat (also spelled Nishan-i-Shujaat) is a civilian honour awarded by the Government of Pakistan for military and civilian acts of conspicuous gallantry, which are not always in the face of the enemy. The Nishan-i-Shujaat is worn as a breast badge suspended from a red ribbon threaded through a gold star and crescent.

Order of precedence

 Nishan-e-Shujaat – Symbol of Bravery
 Hilal-e-Shujaat – Crescent of Bravery
 Sitara-e-Shujaat – Star of Bravery
 Tamgha-e-Shujaat – Medal of Bravery

List of recipients

See also 
Civil decorations of Pakistan

References

External links
 Decorations and Medals of Pakistan

Civil awards and decorations of Pakistan
Military awards and decorations of Pakistan